French School of Hurghada is a French school located in Hurghada, Egypt.

It was established in 2004 and controlled by the cultural center of the French Embassy in Egypt. It teaches children from 3 years old with a French curriculum.

Located between the Marriott and Les Rois Hotels in Hurghada, the French School of Hurghada relocated in September 2009 to a new location 15 km north of Hurghada (between the Fayrouz and El Nour compounds) on the desert road towards El Gouna, on 13,000 m2 of land.

References

External links
 

Private schools in Hurghada
Educational institutions established in 2004
2004 establishments in Egypt
French international schools in Egypt